The 2022 Gulf Western Oil Touring Car Masters Series is an Australian motor racing series for touring cars manufactured 1 January 1963 and the 31 December 1980.

As of 3 July 2022, John Bowe leads the series standings.

Entries

Teams and drivers

References

External links
 
 2022 Gulf Western Oil Touring Car Masters Series Sporting and Technical Regulations, motorsport.org.au, as archived at web.archive.org
 Natsoft Race results

2022
Touring Car Masters